Edward Gardère (25 February 1909 – 24 July 1997) was a French foil and sabre fencer. He won a gold medal at the 1932 Summer Olympics and two silvers at the 1936 Summer Olympics.

References

External links
 

1909 births
1997 deaths
French male foil fencers
Olympic fencers of France
Fencers at the 1932 Summer Olympics
Fencers at the 1936 Summer Olympics
Olympic gold medalists for France
Olympic silver medalists for France
Sportspeople from Vosges (department)
Olympic medalists in fencing
Medalists at the 1932 Summer Olympics
Medalists at the 1936 Summer Olympics
French male sabre fencers
20th-century French people